Patti Cohenour (born October 17, 1952) is an American actress and singer. She last performed as the standby for Elizabeth Arden in the Broadway musical War Paint, a position she also held in the pre Broadway run. Previously she was seen in the Broadway production of The Light in the Piazza as Signora Naccarelli. She was also the alternate for Victoria Clark in the leading role of Margaret Johnson.

Early life
Cohenour was born in Albuquerque, New Mexico, and graduated from Valley High School.

Career 
She originated the Broadway roles of Mary Jane in Big River, Rosa Bud in The Mystery of Edwin Drood (New York, London) and Mother Abbess in The Sound of Music (revival) and understudied Nora in A Doll's Life. She also starred in the Broadway production of The Phantom of the Opera, being the original alternate for Sarah Brightman as Christine Daaé. She later went on to replace Brightman in the role opposite Timothy Nolen, the first baritone Phantom and also the only bass baritone Phantom, and also has played the role of Christine opposite Colm Wilkinson in Toronto.

Additional credits: Mimi in La Bohème; Isabel/Mabel in The Pirates of Penzance (both New York Shakespeare Festival); Magnolia in Hal Prince’s Show Boat; Adeline in Sweet Adeline (Encores!); Katharine in The Taming of the Shrew (Syracuse Stage); Clarice in The Servant of Two Masters; Oh Coward! (Seattle Repertory Theatre); Glinda in The Wizard of Oz; Rosabella in The Most Happy Fella; Abigail Adams in 1776; Lily Craven in The Secret Garden (all 5th Avenue Theatre). Cohenour is the recipient of a Tony nomination, two Drama Desk nominations, the Clarence Derwent Award and a Theatre World Award. Her album To an Isle in the Water was produced by Grammy winner Thomas Z. Shepard and conducted by Paul Gemignani.

Filmography

Television

References

External links
 
 
 
 Official Web Site Patti Cohenour

1952 births
Living people
American sopranos
American stage actresses
Actresses from Albuquerque, New Mexico
21st-century American women